Hedingham Secondary School and Sixth Form is a coeducational secondary school and sixth form with academy status, situated in Christmas Fields in Sible Hedingham, Essex, England.

Curriculum 
The school is under the leadership of Mr Andy Harvison and offers a wide range of subjects, such as rural science, throughout the year groups including Sixth Form.

Recent results
In 2011, Hedingham School saw its best ever A Level and AS Level results with pass rates of 99% and 96% respectively. The school has gained GCSE results which are higher than its previous records. 69% of students gained 5+ A*-C grades including Maths and English. This compares to the same statistic at a level of 45% in 2010 and is higher than the previous best of 56% in 2009. 88% of students achieved 5+ A*-C grades which exceeded the 81% achieved in 2009. 98% of students attained 5+ A*-G passes. The school is among the best performing in the Braintree region of Essex.

References

External links
Hedingham School

Secondary schools in Essex
Academies in Essex